Dorothee Elmiger (born 1985 in Wetzikon) is a Swiss writer. She presently lives in Switzerland. Elmiger is considered one of the most promising young Swiss writers, especially after winning the second Ingeborg Bachmann Prize, the Kelag Prize, in 2010.

Life 
After finishing school her primary schooling, Dorothee Elmiger went to New Hampshire before beginning her studies of philosophy and political sciences at the University of Zurich. She received her professional training at the Swiss Institute for Literature in Biel/Bienne and at the German Institute for Literature in Leipzig, where she spent an exchange semester.

Elmiger has won several prizes, including the aspekte-Literaturpreis and the Rauris Literature Prize for best literary debut. In 2014, Elmiger received the Hermann-Hesse-Förderpreis for her second novel Schlafgänger, in 2015 she was awarded a Swiss Literature Award by the Federal Office of Culture and the Erich Fried Prize.

Her work has been translated into several languages, including English, French, Swedish and Turkish.

Publications 
 Einladung an die Waghalsigen. DuMont, Cologne 2010, 
 Schlafgänger. DuMont, Cologne 2014, 
 Aus der Zuckerfabrik. Hanser, Munich 2020,

External links
 
 „Schweizer Literaturpreise 2015 Dorothee Elmiger“
 „Dorothee Elmiger erhält Erich-Fried-Preis“
 Dorothee Elmiger wins the Bachmann prize
 „Bachmannpreis: Hohe Auszeichnung für Schweizerin“, swissinfo, 27. Juni 2010
 „Zweiter Preis am Bachmann-Wettbewerb für Dorothee Elmiger“, St. Galler Tagblatt, 27. Juni 2010
 „Schöner Erfolg für die Schweizer Literatur“, Tages-Anzeiger, 27. Juni 2010

1985 births
21st-century Swiss women writers
Living people
People from Wetzikon
Swiss writers in German